The alligatorfish (Aspidophoroides monopterygius), also known commonly as the Aleutian alligatorfish and the Atlantic alligatorfish, is a fish in the family Agonidae. It was described by Marcus Elieser Bloch in 1786. It is a marine, temperate water-dwelling fish which is known from the northwestern Atlantic Ocean, including western Greenland; Labrador, Canada; and Cape Cod, Massachusetts, USA. It dwells at a depth range of 0–695 metres, most often around 60–150 m, and inhabits sand and mud bottoms mostly on the lower continental shelf all year. It prefers a temperature range of -1.07 to 2.52 °C. Males can reach a maximum total length of 22 centimetres, but more commonly reach a TL of 14.2 cm.

The Alligatorfish is preyed on by the Atlantic halibut (Hippoglossus hippoglossus) and the Pacific halibut (Hippoglossus stenolepis). Its own diet consists primarily of benthic crustaceans and bottom fauna.

References

Alligatorfish
Fish described in 1786